Fatehgarh Churian R is a village in Batala in Gurdaspur district of Punjab State, India. The village is administrated by Sarpanch an elected representative of the village.

Demography 
, The village has a total number of 822 houses and the population of 4387 of which 2308 are males while 2079 are females.  According to the report published by Census India in 2011, out of the total population of the village 1023 people are from Schedule Caste and the village does not have any Schedule Tribe population so far.

See also
List of villages in India

References

External links 
 Tourism of Punjab
 Census of Punjab

Villages in Gurdaspur district